Haberlandia tempeli is a moth in the family Cossidae. It is found in Ivory Coast. The habitat consists of coastal forests and swamp forests.

The wingspan is about 25.5 mm. The forewings are colonial buff with tawny-olive lines. The hindwings are ecru-olive with a reticulated buffy olive pattern.

Etymology
The species is named in honour of Karl Georg Tempel.

References

Natural History Museum Lepidoptera generic names catalog

Endemic fauna of Ivory Coast
Moths described in 2011
Metarbelinae
Taxa named by Ingo Lehmann